SEK (Sidirodromoi Ellinikou Kratous, Hellenic State Railways) Class Ια (or Class Ia; Iota-alpha) is a class of twenty 2-8-2 steam locomotives purchased from the American Locomotive Company (Alco) in 1915.

They were given the class letters "Ια" and initially numbered 401 to 420, but were later renumbered 701 to 720.

References

 http://balkanmodels.biz/forum/viewtopic.php?f=16&t=286
 http://www.manfred-kopka.de/europa/gritchen/ga.htm
 http://anno.onb.ac.at/cgi-content/anno-plus?aid=lok&datum=1927&page=7&size=45

ALCO locomotives
Ια
2-8-2 locomotives
Steam locomotives of Greece
Railway locomotives introduced in 1915
Standard gauge locomotives of Greece